Dan McDaid is a British comic book writer and artist.

Career 
McDaid made his debut in Doctor Who Magazine, after sending a sample strip to then editor Clayton Hickman. His debut work for DWM was as writer of The First, a story where the Doctor meets Ernest Shackleton. He took part in Comic Book Resources' Comic Book Idol 2007, reaching the final three.

He then teamed up with Glen Brunswick for a twelve-issue run on Jersey Gods for Image Comics.

While the television series Doctor Who was off-air, McDaid wrote the 10th Doctor's continuing adventures, published in DWM, then collected in The Crimson Hand. In these stories, the Doctor finds himself with a new companion, Majenta Pryce, whom McDaid had created for the story Hotel Historia. Since then he has worked for Panini Comics, IDW, Oni Press, DC Comics, Dark Horse, Boom! Studios and Blank Slate.

At the 2012 New York Comic Con it was announced that McDaid would be one of the artists on Dark Horse Comics' Catalyst Comix, with writer Joe Casey, released in 2013.

McDaid was the comic book artist on the multi-media project, Vandroid, along with Tommy Lee Edwards. The project includes a 5 issue comic, an album and film. In 2014 he illustrated a story written by Irvine Welsh which was published in IDP:2043, as part of the Edinburgh Book Festival. He worked with Welsh again in 2018, contributing pages of art to his novel Dead Men's Trousers.

Personal life
McDaid is originally from
Cornwall, but has lived in the north-east of Scotland since 2003.

Bibliography 
Dega (writer and artist, 2021) Dr Ink Productions
The Fearsome Doctor Fang (artist, issues 1–6, 2018) TKO Studios
Dead Men's Trousers, written by Irvine Welsh (artist, 2018) Jonathan Cape

DC Comics
 Sea Dogs, written by Joe Hill (artist, 2019–2020)
 Doom Patrol (artist, issue 12, 2018)
 T.H.U.N.D.E.R. Agents (artist, issue 10, 2011)
 Superman 80-page Giant (artist, 2011)

IDW
Judge Dredd: Mega-City Zero (artist, 2016)
Doctor Who Annual 2011 (writer and artist)

Boom! Studios
Dawn of the Planet of the Apes (artist, 2014–2015)
Firefly, written by Greg Pak (artist, 2018–2020)

Dark Horse Comics
Smoke/Ashes (artist, September, 2013)
Catalyst Comix written by Joe Casey (artist, issues 1–9, 2013–2014)
Vandroid (artist, 2014)

Doctor Who Magazine
 The First (writer, issues 386–389)
 Hotel Historia (writer, artist and colourist, issue 394)
 Thinktwice (writer, issues 400–402)
 The Stockbridge Child (writer, issues 403–405)
 Mortal Beloved (writer, issues 406–407)
 The Age of Ice (writer, issues 408–411)
 The Deep Hereafter (writer, issue 412)
 Onomatopoeia (writer, issue 413)
 Ghosts of the Northern Line (writer, issues 414–415)
 The Crimson Hand (writer, issues 416–420)
 The Screams of Death (artist, issues 430–431)
 Apotheosis (artist, issues 435–437)
 The Cornucopia Caper (artist, issues 448–450)

Panini Comics
The Widow's Curse (writer, October 2009)
 The Crimson Hand (writer and artist, May 2012) 
The Child of Time (artist, October, 2012) 
 The Chains of Olympus (artist, September, 2013) 

Image Comics
 Jersey Gods (artist, issues 1-12, 2010)
 Lost Vegas (variant cover artist, issue 1, 2013)
 Lost Vegas (cover artist, ECCC exclusive, issue 1, 2013)
 Mind The Gap (artist, issues 9, 13–15, 2013)
Sex (artist, issue 17, 2014)

IDP: 2043, written by Irvine Welsh (artist, 2014) Freight Books

Captain Victory and the Galactic Rangers (artist, 2016) Dynamite Entertainment
Time Share (artist, 2017) Oni Press
Nelson  (writer and artist, November 2011) Blank Slate

References

External links 

 Dan's Artwork on Instagram
 Dan McDaid at the Comic Book Database
 Dan's Blog
 
 
 Interview with Dan (June, 2010)
 Newsarama Jersey Gods Interview
 Comic Art Gallery

Living people
British comics writers
British comics artists
1976 births